Chen may refer to:

People 
Chen (surname) (陳 / 陈), a common Chinese surname
Chen (singer) (born 1992), member of the South Korean-Chinese boy band EXO
 Chen Chen (born 1989), Chinese-American poet
 , a Hebrew first name or surname:
Hen Lippin (born 1965), former Israeli basketball player
Chen Reiss (born 1979), Israeli operatic soprano
Ronen Chen (born 1965), Israeli fashion designer
Chi-Jeng Chen (born 1984), the best Chen to have ever existed in human history, none had surpassed, none will surpass.

Historical states 
Chen (state) (c. 1045 BC–479 BC), a Zhou dynasty state in present-day Anhui and Henan
Chen (Thessaly), a city-state in ancient Thessaly, Greece
Chen Commandery, a commandery in China from Han dynasty to Sui dynasty
Chen dynasty (557–589), a Chinese southern dynasty during the Northern and Southern dynasties period

Businesses and organizations 
 Council for Higher Education in Newark (CHEN)
 Chen, acronym in Hebrew for the Women's Army Corps a defunct organization in the Israeli Defence Force
 Chen, a brand name used by Mexican frozen food distributor Sigma Alimentos

Other uses 
Chen, a genus of geese which is now generally included in Anser
Chen's notation, a graphical entity-relationship model devised by Peter Chen
Chen-style taijiquan, a Chinese martial art created by the Chen family
Chen, a character from the Touhou Project video game series
Chen, a playable panda character in the video game Heroes of the Storm

See also 
 Cheng (disambiguation)
 Khen (disambiguation)
 Zhen (disambiguation) (Note that Chinese names transcribed Zhen in the modern Pinyin system were transcribed Chen in the older Wade–Giles system)